Polmear may refer to:

Polmear, Cornwall - a hamlet between Par and Fowey in Cornwall, UK
21585 Polmear - a main-belt asteroid (1998 SX126)